Task Force 88 may refer to:

 Operation Argus: 1950s nuclear weapons test program
 Task Force 88 (Operation Dragoon), an Escort carrier force that participated in Operation Dragoon
 Task Force 88 (Pakistan Navy), see 
 Task Force 88 (United States Navy)